{{DISPLAYTITLE:Nothing to Prove (H2O album)}}

Nothing to Prove is the fifth studio album by American punk rock band H2O. It was released on May 27, 2008, through Bridge 9 Records. It is the band's first album since 2001's Go, and the first new material since their 2002 EP All We Want. The album hit at #7 on Billboard Top Heatseekers on June 14, 2008.

Toby Morse's son Maximus is featured throughout the album, providing intros/outros to many of the songs.

Track listing 

Notes
The track "Mitts" is a reworked version of the songs "Static", which appeared on their 2002 EP All We Want. The band produced a video for "What Happened" featuring actor Michael Rapaport and musicians Matt Skiba and Lou Koller.

Personnel 
 Toby Morse – vocals
 Todd Morse – guitar, vocals
 Rusty Pistachio – guitar, vocals
 Adam Blake – bass
 Todd Friend – drums
 Roger Miret – vocals on "Nothing to Prove"
 Freddy Cricien – vocals on "A Thin Line"
 CIV – guests on "Still Here"
 Lou Koller – guest on "Fairweather Friend" and "What Happened"
 Kevin Seconds – guest on "Fairweather Friend"
 Matt Skiba – guest on "What Happened"
 Danny Diablo – guest on "Nothing to Prove"
 Sons of Nero – artwork
 Stephen Looker – backing vocals

References 

H2O (American band) albums
2008 albums
Bridge 9 Records albums
Albums produced by Chad Gilbert
Albums with cover art by Sons of Nero